Associação Desportiva da Camacha, known as A.D. Camacha, is a Portuguese football club from Santa Cruz, Madeira. Founded in 1978, they play in the Campeonato de Portugal. They play their home games in Campo Municipal da Nogueira, which has a capacity of 3,300. Their chairman is Celso Almeida e Silva and their manager is José Barros.

History
AD Camacha were founded on 1 August 1978 and started off in the Madeira regional Premier league. Over the past 30 years they have managed to reach the Portuguese Second Division, the third-tier of Portuguese football. Campo Municipal da Nogueira has been their home stadium since their founding, and is normally sold out of tickets for their home games.

Honours
 Terceira Divisão – Serie E: 1
2008–09
 AF Madeira Championship: 2
1989–90
2019/2020
 AF Madeira Cup: 5
1989–90, 1991–92, 2000–01, 2003–04, 2010–11

Current squad

References

External links
AD Camacha official site (Portuguese)

Football clubs in Portugal
Association football clubs established in 1978
1978 establishments in Portugal